Varos may refer to:

People 
Dimitris Varos (1949–2017), Greek poet, journalist and photographer

Places 

It means town or city in Hungarian.
Đavolja Varoš, a geographical region of south Serbia noted for its "earth pyramids"
Kotor Varoš, a town and municipality in Bosnia and Herzegovina
Levanjska Varoš, a municipality in Osijek-Baranja county, Croatia
Nova Varoš, a town and municipality in the Zlatibor District of Serbia
Stara Varoš, a municipality in the city of Kragujevac, Serbia
Stara Varoš (Podgorica), a neighbourhood in Podgorica, Montenegro

Other uses 
A fekete város (The Black Town), a 1910 novel by Hungarian writer Kálmán Mikszáth
Vengeance on Varos, a 1985 serial in the television programme Doctor Who